Le Gang is a 1977 French-Italian film starring Alain Delon. It was directed by Jacques Deray.

It recorded admissions of 1,190,355 in France.

Plot
In the post-war France, the Gang of the Tractions Avant headlines by his burglars never causing loss of life.

Cast

References

External links

French crime drama films
1977 films
Films produced by Alain Delon
Films scored by Carlo Rustichelli
1970s French-language films
1970s French films
Italian crime drama films
1977 crime drama films